Mads Thunø Laudrup (born 9 February 1989) is a Danish former professional footballer who played as a midfielder. He has scored two goals and played 29 games for various Danish youth national teams.

Career
Laudrup played for Kjøbenhavns Boldklub (KB), the reserve team of multiple Danish champions F.C. Copenhagen (FCK), while studying at "Falkonergårdens Gymnasium". He made his debut for the Danish under-16 national team in January 2005, and played three matches for the team, all as team captain. In August 2005, he was called up for the Danish under-17 national team, and scored a goal on penalty kick in his debut game; a 4–0 win over Iceland on 2 August 2005. He went on to play 14 matches for the under-17 national team, captaining the team in all 14 games. 

He made his debut for F.C. Copenhagen, the defending 2006 Danish Superliga champions, in the unofficial 2006 Viasat Cup tournament in May 2006. After playing the first half of the 2006–07 season in the KB youth team, Laudrup was a part of the FCK squad for the Scandinavian Royal League 2006-07 tournament. He made his official FCK debut in the Royal League, playing two games against Lillestrøm SK in November and December 2006. At new year 2007 he was promoted to the KB senior squad, one year early, alongside Şaban Özdoğan.

On 30 March 2007 he was selected to FCK's squad against AC Horsens, for the next day's match. With 3 minutes left, he replaced Jesper Grønkjær in this match, which was his league debut. In the summer 2007 he was full-time promoted to the first team and also signed a new contract with F.C. Copenhagen. The deal kept him in the club until the 30 June 2009. He left on 14 January 2009 Kjøbenhavns Boldklub to join Herfølge Boldklub who signed a contract until 30 June 2011.

After his time at Herfølge Boldklub, his career would bring him to three more clubs: Stjarnan, Hobro IK and FC Helsingør. It was at FC Helsingør, that he would eventually decide to immediately retire from professional football, at the age of 26, in December 2015.

Personal life
Mads is the son of former Danish international football player Michael Laudrup, who was awarded Denmark's Best Player Ever by the Danish Football Association in 2006. Mads Laudrup's uncle is former Danish international Brian Laudrup and his grandfather is former Danish international Finn Laudrup. His younger half brother Andreas Laudrup was a professional football player as well. His cousin Nicolai Laudrup son of Brian Laudrup also used to play football, but only in the danish lower leagues, before joining FC Græsrødderne in 2016.

References

External links
 Mads Laudrup on FC Helsingør
Danish national team profile
 Official Danish Superliga stats

1989 births
Living people
Danish men's footballers
Denmark youth international footballers
Footballers from Milan
Kjøbenhavns Boldklub players
F.C. Copenhagen players
Herfølge Boldklub players
HB Køge players
Danish Superliga players
Hobro IK players
Stjarnan players
Association football midfielders
Mads